"Laugh Now Cry Later" is a song by Canadian rapper Drake featuring American rapper Lil Durk. It was released through Republic Records and OVO Sound as a single on August 14, 2020. The two artists wrote the song alongside producers Cardo, Rogét Chahayed, G. Ry, and Yung Exclusive. It was originally the intended lead single from Drake's sixth studio album, Certified Lover Boy (2021).

Commercially, the song debuted at number one in Drake's native Canada on the Canadian Hot 100 and debuted at number two on the US Billboard Hot 100. The song received nominations for Best Melodic Rap Performance and Best Rap Song at the 63rd Annual Grammy Awards.

Background
On August 12, 2020, Drake posted a clip of himself and another person riding jet skis at night on his social media. The post was accompanied by the caption "TMRW MIDNIGHT 🤍". Upon release, it turned out that the song's music video also entailed an upcoming collaboration between Drake and Nike, Inc.

Critical reception
Jeremy D. Larson of Pitchfork praised Drake's delivery, calling the song "one of the lightest and breeziest Drake songs to come out in a while". He further described his presence as "effortlessly cool and simple", while "Lil Durk shows up as a perfect counterpart". Complex thought the song was "a vibe, but not an obvious hit record", neither a "by-the-numbers pop radio play or a hard-hitting club record". According to Charles Holmes at Rolling Stone, the song "sounds like Drake featuring Drake", further explaining that the song "is the embodiment of what happens when you surround real Drake with a room full of past Drakes, like a tortured Canadian reboot of Being John Malkovich". 
Lil Wayne released a version of the song on his No Ceilings 3 mixtape called Something Different which also had a music video.

Music video
The song's official music video was released on August 13, 2020, and was directed by Dave Meyers. It was shot at Nike's headquarters in Beaverton, Oregon, thus receiving criticism for advertising the company and resembling a commercial. The video features shots predominantly of Drake engaging in different sporting activities: boxing underwater (as a reference to Muhammad Ali), running on a treadmill in Nike's sports-science lab, and going on a shopping spree in a closed down Nike store with Instagrammer Aggyabby, as well as Durk and Drake riding jet skis  and Drake posing in oversized white, and cream colored suits with Durk (as a reference to LeBron James). The video also includes several cameos from athletes, including Kevin Durant, Odell Beckham Jr., and Marshawn Lynch, as well as internet comedian Druski & noted shoe designer Ben Nethongkome.

Personnel 
Credits adapted from Tidal.

 Drake – lead vocals, songwriting
 Lil Durk – featured vocals, songwriting
 Cardo - songwriting, production
 Alex Torrez - songwriting
 Allen Ponce - songwriting 
 G. Ry - songwriting, production
 Yung Exclusive - songwriting, production
 Rogét Chahayed - songwriting, production
 Noel Cadastre – recording
 Noah "40" Shebib – mixing
 Chris Athens – mixing
 Turn Me Up Josh - Engineering
 Nick Rice - Recording Engineer 
 Zack Shochet - Assistant Engineer
 JusVibes - Assistant Engineer

Charts

Weekly charts

Year-end charts

Certifications

References

2020 singles
2020 songs
Canadian Hot 100 number-one singles
Drake (musician) songs
Lil Durk songs
OVO Sound singles
Republic Records singles
Song recordings produced by Cardo (record producer)
Songs written by Cardo (record producer)
Songs written by Drake (musician)
Songs written by Rogét Chahayed
Songs written by Lil Durk
Music videos directed by Dave Meyers (director)